Planodema bimaculatoides is a species of beetle in the family Cerambycidae. It was described by Pierre Téocchi and Jérôme Sudre in 2002.

References

Theocridini
Beetles described in 2002